The Embassy of Algeria in Washington, D.C. is the People's Democratic Republic of Algeria's diplomatic mission to the United States. It is located at 2118 Kalorama Road, Northwest, Washington, D.C., in the  Kalorama neighborhood.

Events
On October 8, 2010 there was a protest about the disappearance of Sidi Mouloud.

See also 
List of diplomatic missions in Washington, D.C.
Algeria–United States relations

References

External links

wikimapia
Office website

Algeria
Washington, D.C.
Algeria–United States relations